Kipoi may refer to:
Kipoi, Evros, a village in the Evros regional unit, Greece
Kipoi, Ioannina, a village in Zagori in Ioannina regional unit, Greece 
Kipoi Tonny Nsubuga, a Ugandan politician